Adrián Fernández (born 1963) is a Mexican former professional race car driver and owner of Fernandez Racing team

Adrián Fernández may also refer to:

Adrián Fernández Cabrera (born 1967), Mexican politician
Adrián Fernández (footballer, born 1980), Argentine football striker
Adrián Fernández (footballer, born 1992), Paraguayan football forward
Adrián Fernández (motorcyclist) (born 2004), Spanish motorcycle racer

See also
Adrián Hernández (disambiguation)